The 1925 Ayr Burghs by-election was held on 12 June 1925.  The by-election was held due to the appointment of the incumbent Conservative MP, John Baird, as the Governor-General of Australia.

It was won by the Unionist candidate Thomas Moore.

References

Ayr Burghs by-election
1920s elections in Scotland
Politics of Ayrshire
Ayr Burghs by-election
By-elections to the Parliament of the United Kingdom in Scottish constituencies
Ayr Burghs by-election